A dunlin is a wading bird.

Dunlin may also refer to:
 USS Dunlin, several ships in the U.S. Navy

See also 
 Dunlin oilfield, situated off the coast of Scotland